Convoy SC 118 was the 118th of the numbered series of World War II slow convoys of merchant ships from Sydney, Cape Breton Island, to Liverpool.

Background

As western Atlantic coastal convoys brought an end to the "second happy time", Admiral Karl Dönitz, the Befehlshaber der U-Boote (BdU) or commander in chief of U-boats, shifted focus to the mid-Atlantic to avoid aircraft patrols. Although convoy routing was less predictable in the mid-ocean, Dönitz anticipated that the increased numbers of U-boats being produced would be able to effectively search for convoys with the advantage of intelligence gained through B-Dienst decryption of British Naval Cypher Number 3. However, only 20 percent of the 180 trans-Atlantic convoys sailing from the end of July 1942 until the end of April 1943 lost ships to U-boat attack.

On 2 February  sank three ships from convoy HX 224.

Battle

4 February 1943
A careless merchant seaman of convoy SC 118 fired a pyrotechnic snowflake projector aboard the Norwegian freighter SS Vannik in the pre-dawn darkness of 4 February.  observed the snowflake display, reported sighting the convoy, and was promptly sunk by Beverly and Vimy after Bibb and Toward triangulated the submarine's location from the sighting report, using high-frequency radio direction-finder (HF/DF or Huff-Duff). The destroyers rescued 44 of the submarine's crew.

5 February 1943

7 February 1943
In the pre-dawn hours of 7 February, Kapitänleutnant Siegfried von Forstner's  torpedoed the British freighter Afrika, Norwegian tanker Daghild, Greek freighter Kalliopi, American tanker Robert E. Hopkins, American cargo liner , and convoy rescue ship Toward.

Henry R. Mallory was capable of  but had been straggling well astern of the convoy for several days and was not zig-zagging in that exposed position. Mallory would normally have been assigned to one of the faster HX convoys, but there had been no Iceland section of the preceding convoy HX 224. No commands came from the bridge after Mallory was torpedoed, no flares were sent up, no radio distress message was sent out, and no orders were given to abandon ship. There were heavy casualties from Mallorys crew of 77, 34 Navy gunners, and the 136 American soldiers, 172 American sailors, and 72 American Marines she was transporting to Iceland.

 sank the straggling British freighter Harmala while Lobelia sank .

B-17 Flying Fortress J of No. 220 Squadron RAF sank U-614 on 7 February. U-402 sank British freighter Newton Ash that night. On 9 February Kapitänleutnant von Forstner was awarded the Knight's Cross of the Iron Cross for ships sunk by U-402 from this convoy and from Convoy SC 107 on the previous patrol. SC 118 reached Liverpool without further loss on 12 February.

Ships in convoy

See also
 Convoy Battles of World War II

Notes

References 

 
 
 
 
 
 
 

SC118
Naval battles of World War II involving Canada
C